The 1997 Texas A&M Aggies football team completed the season with a 9–4 record.  The Aggies had a regular season Big 12 record of 6–2.

Schedule

Roster
  1  MICHAEL JAMESON          DB
  3  KYLE BRYANT              PK
  4  THADD HARGETT            QB
  4  DELVIN WRIGHT            DB
  5  TOYA JONES               DB
  6  SHANE LECHLER          QB-P
  7  BRANNDON STEWART         QB
  8  SIRR PARKER              RB
  9  DAT NGUYEN               LB
 13  MICHAEL WILLIAMS         RB
 15  RANDY MCCOWN             QB
 16  AARON OLIVER             WR
 17  TERENCE KITCHENS         PK
 19  VAN GARDNER
 18  SEDRICK CURRY            DB
 20  D'ANDRE HARDEMAN         RB
 21  LAKE CAMPBELL                DB
 23  JASON GLENN              DB
 24  JASON BRAGG              RB
 25  MICHAEL JENNINGS         WR
 27  JEFF WILSON              DB
 28  TRENT DRIVER             LB
 29  QUINTON BROWN            LB
 30  BRANDON JENNINGS         DB
 33  MARC BROYLES             RB
 34  DANTE HALL               RB
 35  Ben Henderson            LB
 36  RONALD PATTON            DB
 39  JASON WEBSTER            DB
 40  ROYLIN BRADLEY           LB
 42  CHRIS TAYLOR             WR
 43  WARRICK HOLDMAN          LB
 44  SEAN CORYATT             LB
 45  BRAD CROWLEY             DL
 46  CORNELIUS ANTHONY        LB
 47  BILL JOHNSTON            P
 48  RICH COADY               DB
 51  PHILLIP MEYERS           LB
 53  REX TUCKER               OL
 56  TOBY MCCARTHY            OL
 57  KEVIN VESTAL             DL
 58  CHRIS THIERRY            LB
 59  MATT MOORE               LB
 62  SEMISI HEIMULI           OL
 63  KYLE LEDNICKY           SNP
 69  KOBY HACKRADT            OL
 71  CHRIS VALLETTA           OL
 72  STEVE MCKINNEY           OL
 73  CAMERON SPIKES           OL
 74  BRANDON HOUSTON          OL
 76  CHRIS RUHMAN             OL
 78  ANDY VINCENT             OL
 79  SHEA HOLDER              OL
 80  CHRIS COLE               WR
 82  RODERRICK BROUGHTON      TE
 84  MATT MAHONE              TE
 86  DARREN BRINKLEY          WR
 87  DERRICK SPILLER          TE
 88  LEROY HODGE              WR
 89  DANIEL CAMPBELL          TE
 90  STEPHEN YOUNG            DL
 91  TANGO MCCAULEY           DL
 92  MIKE KAZMIERSKI          DL
 94  Zerick Rollins       DL
 95  ROCKY BERNARD            DL
 96  RON EDWARDS              DL
 97  MARCUS HEARD             DL
 99  RONALD FLEMONS           DE

Game summaries

Sam Houston State

Southwestern Louisiana

North Texas

Colorado

Iowa State

Kansas State

Texas Tech

Oklahoma State

Baylor

Oklahoma

Texas

Nebraska

UCLA (Cotton Bowl Classic) 

1st quarter scoring: Texas A&M – Brandon Jennings 64-yard interception return after 19-yard return and lateral from Dat Nguyen (Kyle Bryant kick)

2nd quarter scoring: Texas A&M – Zerek Rollins tackled Cade McNown in end zone for safety; Texas A&M – Dante Hall 74-yard run (Bryant kick); UCLA – Jim McElroy 22-yard pass from McNown (Chris Sailer kick)

3rd quarter scoring: UCLA – Skip Hicks 41-yard pass from McNown (Sailer kick); Texas A&M – Chris Cole 43 run (Bryant kick); 
UCLA – McNown 20-yard run (Sailer kick)

4th quarter scoring: UCLA – Ryan Neufeld 5-yard run (McNown run)

References

Texas AandM
Texas A&M Aggies football seasons
Texas AandM Aggies football